Cham Qabrestan (also Romanized as Cham Qabrestān) is a village in Qalayi Rural District, Firuzabad District, Selseleh County, Lorestan Province, Iran. At the 2006 census, its population was 93, in 18 families.

References 

Towns and villages in Selseleh County